Jonas Salk (1914–1995) was the developer of the first effective polio vaccine.

Salk may also refer to:

 Designation for the inactivated (dead) poliovirus form of polio vaccine
 Lee Salk (1926–1992), psychologist and author
 Salk Institute for Biological Studies, a research institute in La Jolla, California, USA
 Salk School of Science, middle school in Manhattan
 Salk Hall

See also 
 SALC (disambiguation)